Nina Sebastiane is a British TV presenter. She has appeared in Loose Women as reporter for a few episodes and presented The Antiques Ghost Show in 2003. She has also worked for such channels as The Baby Channel, Sky Movies, British Eurosport, the Travel Channel, BBC Choice and UKTV Style.. She was also the voiceover for the Thomas Cook Airlines in-flight safety video.

References

External links
Nina Sebastiane website

British television presenters
Living people
Year of birth missing (living people)